Foville's syndrome is caused by the blockage of the perforating branches of the basilar artery in the region of the brainstem known as the pons. It is most frequently caused by lesions such as vascular disease and tumors involving the dorsal pons. 

Structures affected by the lesion are the dorsal pons (pontine tegmentum) which comprises paramedian pontine reticular formation (PPRF), nuclei of cranial nerves VI and VII, corticospinal tract, medial lemniscus, and the medial longitudinal fasciculus. There is involvement of the fifth to eighth cranial nerves, central sympathetic fibres (Horner syndrome) and horizontal gaze palsy.

Presentation
This produces ipsilateral horizontal gaze palsy and facial nerve palsy and contralateral hemiparesis, hemisensory loss, and internuclear ophthalmoplegia.

Diagnosis

Treatment

History 

Foville's syndrome was initially described by Achille-Louis Foville, a French physician, in 1859.

References

External links 

Stroke
Syndromes affecting the nervous system